WGLF (104.1 FM) is a classic hits radio station in the Tallahassee, Florida, market owned by Cumulus Licensing LLC.  Its studios are located in the westside of Tallahassee and its transmitter is based east of the city near Lloyd, Florida.

Although based in Tallahassee, WGLF can be heard all the way into the Tifton, Georgia, and Lake City, Florida markets. WGLF has been broadcasting since the spring of 1970 and is the longest-running FM rock radio station in the state of Florida since late 1988. Prior to it, it was one out of the 2 dominant Top 40/CHR stations for the Tallahassee market. After becoming an AOR format in late 1988, WFHT (now WWOF, known as Z103) became the main dominant Top 40 station for the Tallahassee market until 1995. WGLF was one of the first four FM stations in the Tallahassee market along with WOMA, WBGM, and WOWD.

References

External links

GLF
Radio stations established in 1967
1970 establishments in Florida
Cumulus Media radio stations